League Field was an American football stadium located in Canton, Ohio.  The stadium was home to the Canton Bulldogs of the National Football League from 1905 to 1926.  It had a capacity of 8,000 spectators. The stadium was replaced in the late 1930s by the current Fawcett Stadium.

External links
Stadium information

Defunct American football venues in the United States
Demolished sports venues in Ohio
Ohio League venues
Defunct National Football League venues
Canton Bulldogs
Buildings and structures in Canton, Ohio